Flashwood is a Canadian drama film, directed by Jean-Carl Boucher and released in 2020. Shot over a period of seven years and inspired by Boucher's own childhood in the Montreal suburb of Boisbriand, the film centres on a group of teenage friends whose lives and relationships evolve as the years pass.

The cast includes Pier-Luc Funk, Antoine Desrochers, Simon Pigeon, Maxime Desjardins-Tremblay, Laurent-Christophe de Ruelle, Karelle Tremblay, Martin Dubreuil, Sophie Nélisse, Mehdi Bousaidan, Martin Boily and Rose-Marie Perreault.

The film premiered on March 4, 2020 at the Rendez-vous Québec Cinéma. It premiered commercially on August 7.

References

External links

2020 films
2020 drama films
Canadian coming-of-age drama films
2020s coming-of-age drama films
Quebec films
Films shot in Quebec
Films set in Quebec
2020s French-language films
French-language Canadian films
2020s Canadian films